Jarvis is an 'L' station on the CTA's Red Line, located at 1523 W. Jarvis Avenue in the Rogers Park neighborhood of Chicago, Illinois.

The style of the station is typical for the intermediate Red Line stops between Howard and  – a narrow platform in the middle of the tracks, with the Red Line stopping on the inner tracks, and the Purple Line Express running on the outside tracks during weekday rush hours.

Closure for modernization project

Under these plans that were never implemented, the station would have been replaced by a new auxiliary entrance to Howard at Rogers Avenue.

Notes and references

Notes

References

External links 

 Train schedule (PDF) at CTA official site
  Jarvis Station Page at Chicago-L.org
 Jarvis Station Page CTA official site
 Jarvis Avenue entrance from Google Maps Street View

CTA Red Line stations
Railway stations in the United States opened in 1908
1908 establishments in Illinois